Ethmia hunanensis is a moth in the family Depressariidae. It was described by You-Qiao Liu in 1980. It is found in Hunan, China.

Adults resemble Ethmia maculata but can be distinguished by the number of black dots on the forewings. The number of dots is 15 in E. hunanensis, as opposed to 20 in E. maculata.

References

Moths described in 1980
hunanensis